HCL BigFix (formerly known as IBM BigFix, IBM Endpoint Manager, and Tivoli Endpoint Manager (TEM), as well as the company name, BigFix Inc) is an endpoint management platform enabling IT operations and security teams to automate the discovery, management, and remediation in on-premise, virtual, or cloud endpoints. HCL BigFix automates the management, patching and inventory of nearly 100 operating system versions.

The product was formerly owned and sold by IBM, and sold to HCL Technologies in July 2019.

On July 1, 2019, HCL Technologies completed the acquisition of BigFix from IBM, which had previously acquired BigFix for an undisclosed amount. IBM changed the name of the BigFix product to IBM Tivoli Endpoint Manager (TEM), but then shortened the name to IBM Endpoint Manager (IEM) in 2013. IBM changed the name back to IBM BigFix on July 7, 2015.

History
The software is the result of the integration of assets acquired from BigFix into the IBM portfolio, and extends IBM's capabilities to manage the security and compliance of servers, desktops, roaming laptops, and point-of-sale devices, such as ATMs and self-service kiosks. The software combines endpoint and security management into a single solution and enables organizations to see and manage physical and virtual endpoints. In 2019 IBM sold BigFix to HCL.

Relevance Language
The Relevance Language is a query language created by BigFix, Inc. prior to being purchased by IBM, and is used by the BigFix platform. The purpose of the relevance language is to provide an interface by which properties of a client (such as cpu, disk space, etc.) could be retrieved. The value of the relevance language is that it, to a certain extent, abstracts away platform-specific query mechanisms like WMI, /Proc, and SIM. This allows an operator to learn one query language that works across all supported platforms. In addition to cross platform compatibility, relevance is an efficient query language, often responding up to hundreds of times faster than native alternatives, such as WMI.

Action Script
The Action Script language is a scripting language created by BigFix, Inc. prior to being purchased by IBM, and is used by the BigFix platform. The purpose of the action script language is to provide an interface by which changes can be made to a client. The value of the action script language is that it, to a certain extent, abstracts away platform-specific scripting differences like directory traversal, script execution and flow control. This allows an operator to learn one scripting language that works across all supported platforms.

Platform components
The core HCL BigFix platform can be extended using additional components delivered by HCL:

HCL BigFix for Lifecycle Management includes Patch Management, Remote Control, Software Distribution, and OS Deployment. Patch Management includes patches for Microsoft, UNIX, Linux, and Macintosh operating systems. Remote Control gives you the ability to monitor and control PCs and servers. Software distribution provides a package library and automation toolkit for endpoint administrators. OS Deployment provides imaging and provisioning of operating systems as well as operating system migration capabilities.

HCL BigFix for Patch Management includes vendor patches for Microsoft, UNIX, Linux, and Macintosh operating systems as well as patches for third-party applications by Adobe, Google, and Microsoft.

HCL BigFix for Security and Compliance provides common STIG, CIS, and third-party security baselines, network self quarantine, and removable device control.

HCL BigFix Inventory gathers information about installed software and hardware in a customer's infrastructure. Software Use Analysis tracks application usage on endpoints to determine the number and type of licenses required for licensed software.

HCL BigFix for Server Automation provides hypervisor operations to build and manage virtual machines in a datacenter environment. In addition, the Server Automation component provides the ability to do middleware management tasks to support operating system patching for clustered systems.

References

System administration
Remote administration software
Configuration management